Galda may refer to the following places in Romania:

 Galda de Jos, a commune in Alba County 
 Galda de Sus, a village in Galda de Jos commune 
 Galda (river), a tributary of the Mureș in Alba County